"The People That We Love" is a song by British rock band Bush. It was released on 18 September 2001 as the lead single from the band's fourth studio album, Golden State (2001).

Working title
The song was initially titled "Speed Kills", which can be found on early promotional copies, but it was changed to "The People That We Love" out of sensitivity for the victims of the September 11th terrorist attacks in the United States;  this title was borrowed from the first line of the chorus.

Lyrics and style
The song's lyrical theme revolves around global acts of violence and the destruction they cause, although it was also rumored to be inspired by the Clinton/Gore US presidential campaign documentary, The War Room. Gavin Rossdale noted that the title has "nothing to do with war and nothing to do with aggression -- it was the speed of thought." Stylistically, "The People That We Love" saw a return to form after the experimental sounds of Deconstructed and The Science of Things. Described once as "stop-start grunge heroics", the song also found significant radio play within the early weeks of release but was unable to persevere like early Bush singles.

Music video
The video was directed by Ulf Buddensieck in the summer of 2001 at a London studio. The music video was a big success on television outlets such as MTV2 and MMUSA. Gavin Rossdale expressed his thoughts on the video, stating:

"He (Ulf) came up with a treatment that was exactly what I was looking for.....It was as if I wrote a list and ticked off boxes. He wanted to do something that was edgy and vibrant and alive, and that's exactly what I wanted. Too many videos today are just too dark and moody. They all look like they were shot in a garage. We wanted to be unmoody and undark."

Track listing
AUS CD Single 7567851622
"The People That We Love" - 4:03
"American Eyes" - 3:36
"The People That We Love [Golden Dub Mix]" - 5:42
UK Promo CD Single PRO2782
"Speed Kills [Album Version]" - 4:03

Appearances in the media

 "The People That We Love" was featured on the popular video game Need for Speed Hot Pursuit 2
 The song was also featured on the CW TV series Smallville on the episode "Jitters".

Chart positions

References

2001 songs
2001 singles
Bush (British band) songs
Songs written by Gavin Rossdale
Song recordings produced by Dave Sardy
Atlantic Records singles